The Anneau du Rhin is a  racing circuit situated near Biltzheim, France, about  north of Mulhouse. It is used for racing and club sport events, track days and presentations.

History
The original  circuit was planned and built in 1996 by Marc Rinaldi on the site of a former hunting ground and is now managed by his son François Rinaldi. In 2004, the route was extended with a western loop. The route was completely resurfaced in August 2011 and widened by one meter.

Events
On 14 April 2022, it was announced that Anneau du Rhin would host a round of the World Touring Car Cup on 6–7 August.

Lap records 

The official race lap records at the Anneau du Rhin are listed as:

References

Motorsport venues in France
Sports venues in Haut-Rhin
Sports venues completed in 1996
1996 establishments in France
World Touring Car Championship circuits